The 2010 AFL season was the Adelaide Crows 20th season in the AFL on the back of a 5th place and a semi-final exit in the 2009 AFL season. It was Neil Craig's 7th season at the helm after taking over from Gary Ayres as coach in 2004. The captain for this season was Simon Goodwin and the leadership group consisted of Brad Symes, Scott Stevens, Nathan van Berlo, Ben Rutten, Michael Doughty, Brett Burton and Tyson Edwards.

Squad for 2010
Statistics are correct as of start of 2010 season.
Flags represent place of birth.

Player changes for 2010

In

Out

NAB Cup 

The 2010 NAB Cup was disappointing for the Crows, being eliminated in the first round by rivals . Adelaide never threatened and went down by 56 points, in line for a hot country warm-up via the NAB Challenge route. The Crows travelled to Traeger Park in Alice Springs and were welcomed by torrential downpours.  defeated the Crows by 20 points, 11.10 (76) – 8.6 (54).

Adelaide came back to South Australia for a clash with last seasons wooden spooners . The game was played at Elizabeth Oval, home of local club Central District, and Adelaide prevailed by two points for their first win of the new season.

The last match of Adelaide's pre-season was played against  at Visy Park. It was another close affair, with the Crows prevailing by a point.

Home and away season

Round 1

Round 2

Round 3

Round 4

Round 5

Round 6

Round 7

Round 8

Round 9

Round 10

Round 11

Round 12

Round 13 (Split Round)

Round 14

Round 15

Round 16

Round 17

Round 18

Round 19

Round 20

Round 21

Round 22

Statistics

Team

Individual

Ladder

See also
Adelaide Crows 2010 Playing List

References

Adelaide Football Club seasons
Adelaide Football Club